The Party of the Right, abbreviated to PD, was a political party in Luxembourg between 1914 and 1944.  It was the direct predecessor of the Christian Social People's Party (CSV), which has ruled Luxembourg for all but twelve years since.

Foundation 
The conservative PD was founded on 16 January 1914. Present at the founding were Émile Reuter, Émile Prüm, Mgr. Schiltz, Albert Philippe, Pierre Dupong, Joseph Bech and Mgr. Jean Origer.  The founding of the party in 1914 was a reaction to the formalisation of the other ideological alliances within the Chamber of Deputies. The Socialist Party formed in 1902, whilst the dominant Liberal League was founded in 1904. The party's foundation also took part in a climate of Kulturkampf. When the Education Law of 1912 was passed by a majority in the Chamber of Deputies, several right-wing figures became convinced that it was necessary to organise themselves into a political party.

The name "Catholic People's Party" had initially been suggested, but was later rejected in favour of the term "Party of the Right", so as to be able to appeal to non-Catholics as well.

Overview 
The PD benefited from the break-up of the Socialist-Liberal alliance after the death of Paul Eyschen, and soon became the dominant party, strengthened by the introduction of universal suffrage in 1918. The leader of the Party of the Right would serve as the prime minister from the end of the First World War until the start of the Second, except for a fourteen-month period in the mid-1920s.

The three prime ministers from the Party of the Right were Émile Reuter (1918–1925), Joseph Bech (1926–1937), and Pierre Dupong (1937–1944); the latter two would go on to serve as prime minister as heads of the CSV.  It is also notable that the PD cabinet of 1921–1925 was the only cabinet in Luxembourgian history that included politicians of only one party.

The historian Gilbert Trausch distinguished two streams within the party: on the one hand, agrarian conservatives, who defended the interests of farmers and traditional values, and were ambivalent or hostile towards the world of industry. These rural notables were also hostile towards universal suffrage. On the other hand, were the innovators, generally slightly younger than the first group, and who were inspired by Christian social ideas, and the conviction that social reforms were necessary; this second group was more favourable towards universal suffrage. Émile Prüm and Philippe Bech belonged to the former of these groups, while Emile Reuter and Pierre Dupong represented the latter.

The close relationship between the Catholic Church and the party was illustrated by the presence in the party of the priest Jean Origer, the director of the Luxemburger Wort, and head of the party in the Chamber of Deputies; and of Jean-Baptiste Esch, a writer for the Luxemburger Wort.

Election results

Footnotes

References and further reading
 
 Blau, Lucien (October 2000). "Du parti de la droite au Parti chrétien-social: Un tour de force réussi". (in French). forum, No. 203, p. 25–30
 
 

Right
Conservative parties in Luxembourg
Political parties established in 1914
Political parties disestablished in 1944
History of Luxembourg (1890–1945)
Catholic political parties